RAF Tatenhill is a former Royal Air Force satellite airfield in Tatenhill, Staffordshire, England,  west of Burton on Trent. It was originally known as RAF Crossplains.

History
The field was built in 1941 as a satellite for No. 27 Operational Training Unit RAF (OTU) at RAF Lichfield later becoming a satellite airfield for RAF Wheaton Aston. The design was the wartime RAF standard of three co-intersecting runways, east-west, north-south diagonal. The east-west runway was the only one suitable to safely accommodate bomber take off and landings which hampered its operability.

It was used as a bomber crew training field, which continued in varied training functions until 1944 with Vickers Wellington, Airspeed Oxford and Avro Anson aircraft for RAF Bomber Command. Later a single engine training unit arrived using the Miles Master aircraft. It was then used by the RAF School of Explosives after the disastrous explosion at nearby RAF Fauld, from October 1945 until January 1947. During the post Second World War period when it was still under RAF Control, RAF Tatenhill was used to break up unused and unwanted ammunition before it was dumped at sea.

The airfield had a bomb dump on the south-east side and a number of frying pan dispersals were built on land to the north of the B5234 road, with hangars in this area too.

Current use
The airfield remains in use as Tatenhill Airfield. A wartime Bellman hangar remains in use as of 2013.

References

Bibliography

External links
Pictures of RAF Tatenhill

Royal Air Force stations in Staffordshire
Royal Air Force stations of World War II in the United Kingdom